The Attorney General of Argentina is the chief of all the prosecutors who act before national courts, as well as the designated prosecutor in the Supreme Court. The Attorney General leads the Ministry of Public Prosecutions (Ministerio Público Fiscal; MPF). The Ministry of Public Prosecutions and the Ombudsperson's Office (Defensoría General) make up Argentina's Public Ministry, in accordance to Article 120 of the Argentine constitution.

Since 2017, the Attorney General of Argentina has been Eduardo Casal, who serves in interim fashion following the resignation of Alejandra Gils Carbó.

List of attorneys general
1863–1875 Francisco Pico
1875–1878 Carlos Tejedor
1878–1890 Eduardo Costa
1890–1892 Antonio Malaver
1892–1905 Sabiniano Kier
1905–1917 Julio Botet
1917–1922 José Nicolás Matienzo
1923–1935 Horacio Rodríguez Larreta (attorney general)
1935–1947 Juan Álvarez
1947–1955 Carlos Gabriel Delfino
1955–1958 Sebastián Soler
1958–1966 Ramón Lascano
1966–1973 Eduardo Marquardt
1973–1976 Enrique C. Petracchi
1976–1980 Elías P. Guastavino
1980–1983 Mario Justo Lopez
1983–1987 Juan Octavio Gauna
1987–1989 Andrés José d'Alessio
1989–1991 Oscar Eduardo Roger
1991–1992 Rebón Aldo Montesano
1992–1994 Oscar Luján Fappiano
1994–1997 Ángel Nicolás Agüero Iturbe
1997–2004 Nicolás Eduardo Becerra
2004–2012 Esteban Justo Righi
2012–2017 Alejandra Magdalena Gils Carbó
2017-          Eduardo Casal (Interim)

References

External links
 (in Spanish)

Judiciary of Argentina
Argentine prosecutors
Argentina politics-related lists